The U-Bahn Serfaus (until 2019 Dorfbahn Serfaus for "Village Railway Serfaus") is an underground air cushion funicular people mover system in the Tyrolian village of Serfaus in Austria.

Overview 
Serfaus is a busy ski resort, and during the season has to cater for large numbers of skiers. The slopes are accessed by a cable car and a gondola lift, whose lower stations are situated at one end of the village's main street. A large car park is located at the other end of this street, and the Dorfbahn connects the two, allowing the conversion of the village into a car-free zone. Besides the two terminal stations at Seilbahn (cable car) and Parkplatz (car park), there are two intermediate stations in the village centre.

The line was built in 1985 by the Freissler-Otis company. It consists of a single,  one-track line, with a single train operating on a shuttle basis. The train comprises two cars, is suspended on an air cushion, and is moved by a funicular haulage system.

During the winter season the line operates between 7.45 and 18.45, and between 7.45 and 17.30 or 18.15 in the summer. A single journey takes 7 minutes, with the intermediate stations served only in the respective main load direction (in the morning toward Seilbahn, in the afternoon toward Parkplatz). The service is free of charge.

Extensive renovations were carried out from 2016 to 2019, and the new train began operating in July 2019, almost doubling its passenger capacity.

Stations

Gallery

Notes

References

External links 

 Serfaus Underground Information
 Dorfbahn Serfaus at funimag.com

Underground railways
Hovair people movers
people movers
Passenger rail transport in Austria
Rapid transit in Austria
Railway lines opened in 1985

ru:Зерфаус#Подземная железная дорога